Goya or the Hard Way to Enlightenment is a 1971 East German drama film directed by Konrad Wolf. It was entered into the 7th Moscow International Film Festival where it won a Special Prize. It is based on a novel with the same title by Lion Feuchtwanger.

Plot 
The painter Francisco de Goya achieved reputation and prosperity through his talent and creative power. His clients come from the most important houses in Madrid and so he gradually comes to the royal court of Charles IV. He is passionately drawn to the Duchess Alba and at the same time hates the decadent aristocrat in her. He believes in the king and the church, enjoys his position at court. His colleague and friend Esteve shows him the contradictions of this closed world and leads him to the simple people of the country. In a Madrid tavern he meets the singer Maria Rosario; later he has to see her being condemned by the Inquisition. He is deeply shocked by the song that Maria has to recite as proof of her guilt. The further he penetrates into the life of the people, drawing motifs for his art from it, the greater his inner pain becomes in view of the conditions in the country. His relationship with the Alba gains in self-destruction and so he suffers a sudden hearing loss. He turns his back on the farm and travels completely deaf to his mother's home in Aragon. With the help of his companion Esteve, he finds his way back to his work, which leads him to an inner turning away from the values ​​of society and the church. He is plagued by demons whom he recognizes in their deeds and their social influence and which flow into his work. He himself falls into the clutches of the Inquisition; the Grand Inquisitor implores him to refuse this idea. But Goya is firmly established in the belief that the misery and horror arise from the circumstances themselves and remains convinced of the truth of his pictures. He chooses exile.

1808 in Madrid, an uprising of residents against the occupation of the by French troops was brutally suppressed. Struck by what he saw, Goya proceeded to create a cycle of etchings The Disasters of War.

Cast
 Donatas Banionis as Francisco Goya
 Olivera Katarina as The Duchess of Alba
 Fred Düren as Esteve
 Tatyana Lolova as Queen Maria Luisa
 Rolf Hoppe as Charles IV of Spain
 Mieczyslaw Voit as Grand Inquisitor
 Mikhail Kozakov as Gilmarde
 Arno Wyzniewski as Quintana
 Lyudmila Chursina as Pepa
 Veriko Andjaparidze as Mother
 Ariadna Shengelaya as Josefa
 Gustaw Holoubek as Bermudez
 Wolfgang Kieling as Manuel Godoy

References

External links
 

1971 films
1970s biographical films
1971 multilingual films
1970s German-language films
German biographical films
Soviet biographical films
East German films
Films directed by Konrad Wolf
Biographical films about painters
Films based on German novels
Cultural depictions of Francisco Goya
Films set in the 1790s
Films set in 1808
Films set in the 1810s
Films set in the 1820s
Films set in Spain
Films shot in Bulgaria
Films shot in Croatia
Films shot in Russia
Films shot in Ukraine
Films shot in Yugoslavia
Napoleonic Wars films
Soviet multilingual films
German multilingual films
1970s German films